Ashurst station may refer to the following UK stations:

 Ashurst (Kent) railway station
 Ashurst (New Forest) railway station